The Originalist is a 2015 play that depicts the relationship between United States Supreme Court associate justice Antonin Scalia (1936–2016) and a fictional Supreme Court law clerk whose views differ from his. Written by John Strand, the play was originally produced for stage performance in Washington, DC in 2015 under director Molly Smith; actor Edward Gero portrayed Scalia. The play received a positive review in The New York Times and has been produced at multiple theaters. In March 2017, the play was broadcast on public television.

Plot
Justice Scalia is entering a new term of the Supreme Court and reviewing applications for law clerks to serve in his office during the coming year. One of the applications he receives is from Cat, a recent woman graduate from law school who wishes to be his law clerk and who also has firmly held liberal beliefs. Scalia is intrigued and invites her for an interview. The interview leads to heated exchanges in which the potential law clerk makes strong assertions about her liberal beliefs and claims that these convictions do not mean she is unqualified to be a clerk for a conservative Justice of the Court. When Scalia protests, Cat asserts herself as a practicing Roman Catholic who has an equal voice in representing her legal opinions concerning cases coming before the Court. After some further verbal sparring, Scalia agrees to take her on as his law clerk and as someone capable of making reasoned arguments on positions which do not necessarily align completely with his own.

Soon after she becomes his clerk, legal blogs begin reporting personal details of Scalia's new law clerk and details of her personal life. She feels compelled to present these to Scalia prior to them being made public in the press and causing possible embarrassment to Scalia in that way. She admits to being part of the LGBT movement and that she is involved in an LGBT relationship. Rather than becoming angry, Scalia indicates that he is better-informed than she may have thought and that he had received a preliminary report of this matter through his own review of some of the legal blogs. He accepts her statement and she continues as his legal clerk.

While clerking for Scalia she has further confrontations with both Scalia and his other highly conservative law clerk. At one point, Scalia requires her to join him at a shooting range, and he teaches her to shoot a rifle. Unexpectedly, the two are able to debate issues of the Court further in a manner suggesting that Scalia is more open-minded than often-stated opinions of him as an arch-conservative. Their mutual animosity and differences of opinion begin to shift considerably when Scalia appears to suffer from heart palpitations, and she quickly comes to his side to assist him as best she can. Later, when her own father appears to become mortally ill and on his death bed, Scalia offers his own sympathy for her imminent loss. The play ends with the two of them reconciling to that fact that both their differences and their similarities appear to signify more than the direct review of the cases coming before the Court in the particular year when she is one of his law clerks.

Performance
The play was first performed at the Arena Stage in Washington, DC in 2015. Lead actor Edward Gero met with Scalia and observed him during a Supreme Court oral argument before portraying him onstage. The New York Times gave the play a positive review, stating: "Mr. Gero's portrayal is a more reflective version of Justice Scalia than the one the public sees. It is also more sympathetic than many might expect." The play began its stage production at the Pasadena Playhouse in California on April 11, 2017.

From July 19 to August 19, 2018, the play was performed at the 59E59 Theaters in New York City, with Gero continuing in the lead role and Tracy Ifeachor as the fictional law clerk. Following the performance of July 29, 2018, Justice Ruth Bader Ginsburg participated in a conversation on stage with the play's director, Molly Smith.

Public television		
In March 2017, an onstage performance of The Originalist was broadcast three times on PBS' Theater Close-Up.

See also
 Law clerk of the Supreme Court of the United States

References

2015 plays
American plays
Plays based on real people